NA-178 Muzaffargarh-IV is a constituency for the National Assembly of Pakistan.

Election 2018 

General elections are scheduled to be held on 25 July 2018.

See also
NA-177 Muzaffargarh-I
NA-179 Muzaffargarh-III

References 

Muzaffargarh

Constituencies of Muzaffargarh
Politics of Muzaffargarh
Constituencies of Punjab, Pakistan
Constituencies of Pakistan